My Old Kentucky Home is a 1938 American romantic drama film directed by Lambert Hillyer and starring Evelyn Venable, Grant Richards and Clara Blandick. It takes its title from the song "My Old Kentucky Home". It was distributed by Monogram Pictures. The film's sets were designed by the art director Frank Dexter.

Synopsis
Larry Blair is engaged to Lisbeth, but is tempted by the attractions of a female singer. When Larry suffers an accident and risks losing his sight, it is Lisbeth who nurses him back to health.

Cast
 Evelyn Venable as Lisbeth Calvert  
 Grant Richards as Larry Blair 
 Clara Blandick as Julia 'Granny' Blair  
 Bernadene Hayes as Gail Burke  
 J. Farrell MacDonald as Mayor Jim Hopkins  
 Margaret Marquis as Lucy Belle
 Cornelius Keefe as Trent Burke  
 Kitty McHugh as Peggy Price  
 Raquel Davidovich as Babette  
 Paul White as Scipio-Singer  
 Mildred Gover as Callio
 Hall Johnson as Leader of the Hall Johnson Choir

References

Bibliography
 John E. Kleber. The Kentucky Encyclopedia. University Press of Kentucky, 2015.

External links
 

1938 films
1930s romance films
American romance films
Films directed by Lambert Hillyer
Films set in Kentucky
Monogram Pictures films
American black-and-white films
1930s English-language films
1930s American films